The Downtown Wellington Historic District, in Wellington, Kansas, is a  historic district which was listed on the National Register of Historic Places in 2007.

The district follows Washington Avenue, the main business thoroughfare, and is roughly bounded by 19th St., 4th St., Jefferson Ave. and the alley behind the Washington Ave.-facing buildings.

The listing included 65 contributing buildings.

References

Historic districts on the National Register of Historic Places in Kansas
Moderne architecture in the United States
Art Deco architecture in Kansas
National Register of Historic Places in Sumner County, Kansas